KORT-FM (92.7 FM) is a radio station broadcasting a country music format. Licensed to Grangeville, Idaho, United States, the station is currently owned by James Nelly, Jr. and Darcy Nelly through licensee Nelly Broadcasting Idaho, LLC, and features programming from Cumulus Media.

KORT-FM received its license to cover on October 6, 1980.

Translators
In addition to the main station, KORT-FM is relayed by an additional three translators to widen its broadcast area.

References

External links

FCC history cards for KORT-FM

ORT-FM
Country radio stations in the United States
Radio stations established in 1979
1979 establishments in Idaho